The Bolivar Court Square Historic District in Bolivar, Tennessee is a  historic district which was listed on the National Register of Historic Places in 1980.  It then included 28 contributing buildings and a contributing object (a monument).  It also includes 12 non-contributing buildings.

It is at U.S. Route 64 and State Route 125

Architectural firm Willis, Sloan & Trigg contracted for the courthouse and Spires Boling is credited with the design.

Architecture includes Classical Revival, Greek Revival, and Italianate.

References

Historic districts on the National Register of Historic Places in Tennessee
Greek Revival architecture in Tennessee
Italianate architecture in Tennessee
Neoclassical architecture in Tennessee
Hardeman County, Tennessee